Martha Anne Smith (born October 16, 1952) is an American actress, television personality, real estate broker, and former model.

Career

Modeling
In July 1973, Smith was selected as Playboy magazine's Playmate of the Month. Her centerfold feature was photographed by Pompeo Posar.

Television
Smith began her career in television commercials. In 1976, Smith started acting in small roles in television series, including Quincy, M.E., Charlie's Angels, Happy Days, and Taxi.

As a television actress, Smith is best known for her regular cast role as Agent Francine Desmond, on the CBS adventure series Scarecrow and Mrs. King appearing for all four seasons from 1983 to 1987, with Kate Jackson and Bruce Boxleitner. She was cast in 1982 as Sandy Horton on the NBC soap opera series Days of Our Lives. Smith also had a role on Dallas as Walt Driscoll's wife.

Smith also appeared as a guest on several 1980s and 1990s American television game shows, including The $25,000 Pyramid, The $100,000 Pyramid with Dick Clark, Super Password, Celebrity Hot Potato, Body Language, and The New Hollywood Squares.

Motion pictures
Smith's first acting role in a feature-length film was in National Lampoon's Animal House, directed by John Landis and released in 1978, as sorority girl Barbara "Babs" Jansen. In 2008, Smith recalled her experience working on the 1978 comedy classic: "Having just returned from the Chicago reunion event at Hollywood Boulevard, I can say it's never ceased to astonish me just how deeply this movie has carved itself into the American psyche. It's hard to know which is more impressive: the AFI Top 100 Funniest Films List, the induction into the Library of Congress National Film Registry or my personal favorite accolade the parody issue of Mad Magazine."

After the turn of the 21st century, Smith's acting appearances became more sporadic. Among her later film appearances were in the 2006 film Loveless in Los Angeles, a romantic comedy movie that took place behind the scenes of a reality dating show, and a featured role, that of Kitty Carloff, in the 2009 film The Seduction of Dr. Fugazzi, which also starred Faye Dunaway.

Real estate work
Smith began a real estate career in 1995 and became a full-time real estate broker/agent for Keller Williams Realty, serving a select, high-end clientele, largely in the Beverly Hills and Hollywood Hills areas. She has operated as an exclusive, service-oriented boutique-style real estate service agent within the broader framework of the Keller Williams branded environment.

Smith appeared on the HGTV real estate television series Selling LA one of Keller Williams's brokers. The third episode of the first season described her as having "an A-list Rolodex of busy clients, including legendary drummer Matt Sorum, former member of the hard rock band Guns N' Roses and member of the supergroup Velvet Revolver".

Personal life
Smith was raised in Farmington, Michigan, and attended Michigan State University, where she acquired fluency in French and Italian.

Smith is known to have been married twice, first to Mel Blanc's son Noel from 1977 to 1986, and then to jazz musician Keith England, beginning in May 2000. She has no children from either marriage.

References

External links  

Official real estate site, Keller Williams

1970s Playboy Playmates
American television actresses
1952 births
Living people
Actresses from Cleveland
American film actresses
Michigan State University alumni
21st-century American women